Malaho is a town in northern Tadjoura Region of Djibouti. It is situated about 114 kilometres (70 miles) north of Tadjoura and 13 km (8 mi) west of the border with Ethiopia.

Overview
It lies on the National Highway 11. Nearby towns and villages include Balho, Dorra and Randa.

References

Populated places in Djibouti
Tadjourah Region